Stixis obtusifolia is a shrub or liana in the Resedaceae family. It is found in parts of Southeast Asia. The wood is used as fuel, the leaves as a tea.

Description
This species grows as a deciduous shrub or liana.
 
It has silvery stems and branches. Leaves are simple, the adult leaves are glabrous, though occasionally with a few hairs on the nerves. 
The gynophore is shorter than 5mm and hairy, the ovary is glabrous.

Flowering occurs from November to March, fruiting from January to April.

Distribution
This Southeast Asian species grows in the following countries: Cambodia, Laos, Thailand and Myanmar.

Habitat, ecology
The plant grows in degraded formations.

In the vegetation communities alongside the Mekong in Kratie and Steung Treng Provinces, Cambodia, this taxa is rare in the degraded areas of the riverine community. It grows on soils derived from metamorphic sandstone bedrock, at 20-25m altitude.

Vernacular names
Aw krâpë (av kraboe, ao krâpoeu) (aw="skin", krâpë="crocodile", Khmer) is a name used in Cambodia.

Uses
The wood furnishes firewood. The leaves can give a tea-like drink

History
Henri Ernest Baillon (1827–95), a French botanist and physician, described the species in 1887 in the journal Bulletin Mensuel de la Société Linnéenne de Paris (Paris).

Further reading
Dy Phon, P. (2000). Dictionnaire des plantes utilisées au Cambodge: 1-915. chez l'auteur, Phnom Penh, Cambodia.
T. Smitinand & K. Larsen, eds. (1987). Flora of Thailand 5: 1-470. The Forest Herbarium, Royal Forest Department.

References

obtusifolia
Flora of Cambodia
Flora of Laos
Flora of Thailand
Flora of Myanmar
Flora of Indo-China
Plants described in 1887
Taxa named by Henri Ernest Baillon